4th Roann Covered Bridge is a historic Howe Truss covered bridge located in Paw Paw Township, Wabash County, Indiana.  It was built in 1877 by the Smith Bridge Company of Toledo, Ohio and crosses the Eel River.  It measures 288 feet long and is 15 feet, 4 inches wide.  The bridge has painted board and batten siding.

It was listed on the National Register of Historic Places in 1981.  It is located in the Roann Historic District.

References

Covered bridges on the National Register of Historic Places in Indiana
Bridges completed in 1877
Transportation buildings and structures in Wabash County, Indiana
National Register of Historic Places in Wabash County, Indiana
Road bridges on the National Register of Historic Places in Indiana
Wooden bridges in Indiana
Howe truss bridges in the United States
1877 establishments in Indiana